Hornady Manufacturing Company is an American manufacturer of ammunition cartridges, components and handloading equipments, based in Grand Island, Nebraska.

History
The company is currently run by Joyce Hornady's son, Steve Hornady, who took over after his father's death in a plane crash on January 15, 1981. The Piper Aztec, with Hornady at the controls flying in heavy fog, crashed into Lake Pontchartrain while on final approach to New Orleans Lakefront Airport.

Pacific Tool Company
Steve Hornady worked for Pacific Tool Company from 1960 to 1971, from the time the company moved from California to Nebraska until Pacific Tool was bought by Hornady. Pacific's DL-366 was their final progressive press and Hornady's first, and it is still manufactured by Hornady as the 366 Auto.

Products

Cartridges 
Hornady makes target shooting and hunting rounds as well as self-defense loads. In 1990, the Hornady XTP (which stands for Extreme Terminal Performance) won the industry's Product Award of Merit 1990 from the National Association of Federal Licensed Dealers. The company was the primary developer of the .17 HMR and .17 HM2 rimfire cartridges, which has become increasingly popular for small game and vermin hunting. Hornady has worked closely with firearms maker Sturm, Ruger on the development of the new line of Ruger cartridges including the .480 Ruger, .204 Ruger, and .375 Ruger.

The company developed the LEVERevolution ammunition, which uses a spitzer bullet with a soft elastomer tip to give better aerodynamic performance than flatter bullets, while eliminating the risk of a shock driving the pointed polymer tip of a bullet in a lever-action rifle's tube magazine into the primer of the cartridge in front, causing an explosion.

At the beginning of 2012, Hornady brought out a "Zombie Max" bullet, apparently due to the growing interest in "Zombie Shooting" in America.

Hornady released the Vintage Match ammunition to replicate the original military performance specifications unique to wartime rifles such as the Mauser, Lee–Enfield, Mosin–Nagant, Swedish Mauser or others chambered in 6.5×55mm, .303 British, 7.62×54mmR, 7.92×57mm Mauser and .30-06.

6.5mm Creedmoor 

In 2007, Hornady released the first 6.5mm Creedmoor Cartridge. The 6.5 Creedmoor was a joint development between former Marine Corps competitive shooter David Tubb and Hornady Ballistician David Emary. Hornady Manufactures 6.5 Creedmoor cartridges, bullets and reloading dies.

6.5 PRC 
The 6.5 PRC (Precision Rifle Cartridge) was initially designed by George Gardner of GA Precision and Hornady in 2013 and released at the 2018 SHOT Show. It is essentially a more powerful and flatter-shooting version of the 6.5mm Creedmor and uses the same bullet, but not the same cartridge case.

300 PRC 
The American ammunition manufacturer Hornady got the 300 Precision Rifle Cartridge SAAMI-standardized in 2018. In 2019 it got C.I.P.-standardized as the 300 PRC. The .375 Ruger cartridge has functioned as the parent case for the 300 Precision Rifle Cartridge (300 PRC), which is essentially a necked-down version of the .375 Ruger.  The .375 Ruger cartridge case was used by Hornady as the basis for a new extra long range cartridge since it had the capability to operate with high chamber pressures which, combined with a neck and barrel throat optimized for loading relatively long and heavy .308 diameter very-low-drag bullets without the need to seat the bullets deeply recessed into the case result in adequate muzzle velocities from magnum sized bolt-action rifles. Rifles chambered for the 300 Precision Rifle Cartridge must be capable of handling  overall length cartridges.

Handloading 
Hornady manufactures a range of handloading components including cartridge cases, bullets and shotgun shell components. Hornady also produces a wide range handloading equipments such as presses, dies, powder measures, scales, case prepping tools, gauges, tumblers/ultrasonic cleaners and other accessories, as well as publishing a reloading data handbook that is currently in its 11th edition.

Security 
In 2013, Hornady launched its Security division, dedicated to gun storage products and accessories. Their gun safes are offered in different product categories, which include the RAPiD Safes, Keyed Safes and Lock Boxes.  Hornady also sell gun safe accessories such as dehumidifiers, gun racks and hangers, RFID accessories, etc. In 2015, Hornady acquired the SnapSafe, a manufacturer known for its modular safes also headquartered in Grand Island, but these products remain marketed under the SnapSafe brand.

References

External links

Hornady videos and information on Ultimate Reloader

Manufacturing companies established in 1949
Ammunition manufacturers
Manufacturing companies based in Nebraska
Hall County, Nebraska
Privately held companies based in Nebraska
1949 establishments in Nebraska